Cashman is a computer game by Bill Dunlevy (co-creator of Time Bandit) and Doug Frayer for the TRS-80 Color Computer and Dragon 32 (Also released on the Sanyo MBC-550), published by Computer Shack in July 1983.  The game contains a mixture of elements from other platform games, most notably Jumpman. The player can control either a Sailor or a Sheikh, running up and down stairs and avoiding bats, cats, bombs, and other creatures in order to collect dollar signs. It was one of the most popular third party games for the system .

References

External links
Review in The Rainbow

1983 video games
Dragon 32 games
Platform games
TRS-80 Color Computer games
Video games developed in the United States
Single-player video games